Cher (Berrichon: Char) is a department in the administrative region of Centre-Val de Loire, France. It is named after the river Cher. In 2019, it had a population of 302,306.

History
Cher is one of the original 83 departments created during the French Revolution on 4 March 1790. Most of it was created, along with the adjacent department of Indre from the former province of Berry. The southeastern corner of the department, however, was part of the Duchy of Bourbon.

Geography
The department is part of the current administrative region of Centre-Val de Loire. It is surrounded by the departments of Indre, Loir-et-Cher, Loiret, Nièvre, Allier, and Creuse.

Principal towns

The most populous commune is Bourges, the prefecture. As of 2019, there are 8 communes with more than 5,000 inhabitants:

Demographics

The inhabitants of the department are called Chériens or Berrichons after the former province of Berry.

Politics

The President of the General Council is Jacques Fleury of The Republicans, elected in July 2021.

Current National Assembly representatives

Tourism
The Bourges Cathedral of St. Étienne is a major tourist attraction.

Languages
The historical languages are Berrichon and the northern version of Bourbonnais. These are both dialects of French, or the Langues d'oïl. They are named respectively after the former Province of Berry and the former Duchy of Bourbon. 
Some 11 communes in the extreme South used to speak Occitan.

The old dialects were in widespread use until the middle decades of the twentieth century and incorporated major regional variations within the department, influenced by the dialects of adjacent regions near the departmental frontiers. During the twentieth century government educational policy promoted a more standardised version of the French language.

In the extreme south of the department influence from the southern Occitan language begins to appear, with "chambrat" being used in place of "grenier a foin" (hayloft), "betoulle" in place of "bouleau" (birch tree) and "aigue" in place of "eau" (water).

See also
Cantons of the Cher department
Communes of the Cher department
Arrondissements of the Cher department

References

External links
  Departmental Council of Cher
  Prefecture of Cher

  

 
1790 establishments in France
Departments of Centre-Val de Loire
Centre region articles needing translation from French Wikipedia
States and territories established in 1790